Bert or Bertram Bak(k)er may refer to:

Bert Baker, character in Springtime in the Sierras
Bertram Baker (1898–1985), member of the New York State Assembly
Bert Bakker (1912–1969), Dutch writer and publisher

See also
Albert Baker (disambiguation)
Robert Baker (disambiguation)
Herbert Baker (disambiguation)